Z-Man Records is an Australian record label founded in 2009 by Lou Risdale, former event manager of the Meredith Music Festival and Golden Plains Festival.

Artists
The following artists are currently signed to Z-Man Records:
The Bonniwells
The Coralinas
God
Mark Steiner & His Problems
Noah Taylor & the Sloppy Boys
Parading
Sleepwalks

Alumni
A list of former artists:
Mother & Father
Witch Hats

See also
 List of record labels

References

External links
Official Myspace
Z-Man Records on last.fm

Record labels established in 2009
Australian independent record labels
Indie rock record labels
Record labels based in Melbourne